Högadals IS is a Swedish football club located in Karlshamn.

Background
Högadals IS currently plays in Division 4 Blekinge which is the sixth tier of Swedish football. The club competed in the Allsvenskan for one season in 1962.  They play their home matches at the Vägga IP in Karlshamn.

The club is affiliated to Blekinge Fotbollförbund. Högadals IS have competed in the Svenska Cupen on 19 occasions and have played 43 matches in the competition.

Season to season

Footnotes

External links
 Högadals IS – Official website
 Högadals IS on Facebook

Football clubs in Blekinge County
Association football clubs established in 1921
1921 establishments in Sweden